Loope (formerly, Loopeville and Monitor) is an unincorporated community in Alpine County, California. It is located on Monitor Creek, at an elevation of 6188 feet (1886 m).

A post office operated at Monitor from 1863 to 1888. The Loope post office operated from 1898 to 1908.

The place was originally named from the nearby Monitor Mine, which in turn was named for the Civil War naval vessel.  It was renamed in honor of a Dr. Loope who resurrected the mining industry locally with the influx of investments from the east coast.

References

External links

Unincorporated communities in California
Unincorporated communities in Alpine County, California